The Batar rocket launcher is a weapon developed by the Izz ad-Din al-Qassam Brigades, the military wing of Palestinian militant group Hamas during the Al-Aqsa Intifada. The weapon was reportedly created and produced in clandestine workshops in the Gaza strip under the direction of Adnan al-Ghoul until his assassination by Israel. It was used for Palestinian rocket attacks on Israel.

The Batar consists of a simple launch tube supported by a tripod and firing a projectile of unknown anti-tank or anti-personnel capabilities. The rear of the rocket is connected to a wire, which allows Hamas militants to fire the projectile from a safe distance.

However, the al-Batar has proved to be ineffective against Israeli armor.

Hamas
Anti-tank rockets of Palestine
Palestinian inventions
Homemade firearms
Insurgency weapons